Skarð is a small farm and a church parish in southwestern Iceland in the Rangárþing ytra municipality (before 2002: Landsveit), Rangárvallasýsla county, and Southern Region, along road 26 (Landvegur), northwest of Hekla.

The present Skarð church was built in 1931. The parish shares a priest with four other church parishes (Árbæjar, Haga, Kálfholts, Marteinstungu) under the name Fellsmúlaprestakall. This parish and church is called "Skarðskirkja á Landi" to disambiguate from other places named Skarð. The original Roman Catholic church was devoted to archangel Michael.

References

Populated places in Southern Region (Iceland)